Fons may refer to:

Places 
 Fons, Ardèche, France
 Fons, Gard, France
 Fons, Lot, France

Other uses 
 Fons memorabilium universi, a Renaissance encyclopedia
 Fontus, an ancient Roman water deity
 Leonard Fons (1903–1956), American politician
 Jorge Fons Pérez (1939-2022), Mexican film director
 A Dutch masculine given name, see Alphons
 Fons, from Formuleichon Fons

See also  
 Fon (disambiguation)